Rhona is the name of:

 Rhona Adair (1878–1961), British golf champion
 Rhona Bennett (born 1976), American singer, actress and model
 Rhona Brankin (born 1950), Labour Co-operative politician and Member of the Scottish Parliament
 Rhona Brown (1922–2014), South African botanical artist and housewife
 Rhona Cameron (born 1965), Scottish comedian
 Rhona (TV series), short-lived Scottish sitcom starring Cameron
 Rhona Goskirk, fictional character on ITV's Emmerdale
 Rhona Graff, senior vice-president of the Trump Organization
 Rhona Haszard (1901–1931), New Zealand artist
 Rhona Martin (born 1966), Scottish curler and skip of the Great Britain team
 Rhona McLeod, Scottish broadcaster
 Rhona Mitra (born 1976), British actress, model and singer
 Rhona Robertson (born 1970), New Zealand former badminton player
 Rhona Simpson (born 1972), Scottish field hockey player
Rhona Smith, British legal academic

See also
Rona (disambiguation)
Rhonda

Scottish feminine given names